Suburban Rhythm is a 17-song obituary for the band of the same name. This compilation is Suburban Rhythm's only CD release, which was produced three years after the band's breakup. It includes three tracks from the Hose demo, the missing song is "Matahari" which the band omitted for various reasons. Four songs from the Almost There 7" EP and nine unreleased songs which were from the aborted LP sessions. The Almost There tracks were taken from these sessions. Five tracks were recorded live at The Black Room in Santa Ana, California.

The artwork features numerous photos taken by Los Angeles photographer Patrick Miller, and features liner notes by Tom Dumont guitarist for the band No Doubt. It was released on Solid Records.

It is currently out of print, and can occasionally be found in bargain bins at record shops, at obscure ska concerts, or online with some effort.

Track listing 
"Lust" - 3:15
"18 Inch Ruler" - 4:11
"Coming out of the Woodwork" - 3:50
"Incomplete" - 4:42
"My Sister Sam" - 3:22
"Gameshow" - 2:43
"Blue Hawaii" - 1:20
"99 Degrees" - 3:14
"Mr. Smooth Guy" - 2:25
"Bixville" - 1:53
"Bright City Lights" - 2:13
"Tension" (Live) - 4:50
"Kung Fu Fighting" (Live) - 2:55
"Incomplete" (Live) - 4:44
"My Sister Sam" (Live) - 3:24
"Don't Mess with the Little Guy" (Live) - 3:38
"Uniform of Destruction" (Hidden) - 3:24

Personnel 

Tracks 1.-11.

Rodi delGadillo - Keyboards, Vocals

Carlos delaGarza - Drums

Ed Kampwirth - Bass, Vocals

Scott Moran - Guitar

Dennis Owens - Vocals

Tracks 12. - 16. 
Recorded live at the Black Room in Anaheim, Ca.

Track 17. recorded at band rehearsal.

Rodi delGadillo - Keyboards, Vocals

Carlos delaGarza - Drums

Ed Kampwirth - Bass, Vocals

Jake Kline- Guitar

Dennis Owens - Vocals

1997 albums